

Films

1960 in LGBT history
LGBT
1960
LGBT
1960